A township is a type of municipality in the Canadian province of Ontario. They can have either single-tier status or lower-tier status.

Ontario has 200 townships that had a cumulative population of 990,396 and an average population of 4,952 in the 2011 Census. Ontario's largest and smallest townships are Centre Wellington and Cockburn Island with populations of 26,693 and 0 respectively.

History 
Under the former Municipal Act, 1990, a township was a type of local municipality. Under this former legislation, a locality with a population of 1,000 or more could have been incorporated as a township by Ontario's Municipal Board upon review of an application from 75 or more residents of the locality. It also provided that a township could include "a union of townships and a municipality composed of two or more townships".

In the transition to the Municipal Act, 2001, these requirements were abandoned and, as at December 31, 2002, every township that:
"existed and formed part of a county, a regional or district municipality or the County of Oxford for municipal purposes" became a lower-tier municipality yet retained its name as a township; and
"existed and did not form part of a county, a regional or district municipality or the County of Oxford for municipal purposes" became a single-tier municipality yet retained its name as a township.
The current legislation also provides lower and single-tier municipalities with the authority to name themselves as "townships", or other former municipal status types such as "cities", "towns" or "villages", or generically as "municipalities".

Township municipalities in Ontario

Former township municipalities

See also 
List of cities in Ontario
List of communities in Ontario
List of municipalities in Ontario
List of towns in Ontario
List of townships in Ontario (includes historical townships)
List of villages in Ontario

Notes

References 

Ontario
Township
 List